Ism is a 2016 Indian Telugu-language action film produced by Nandamuri Kalyan Ram under N. T. R. Arts banner and directed by Puri Jagannadh. It stars Nandamuri Kalyan Ram, Aditi Arya and Jagapati Babu. The film marks Aditi Arya's debut as an actress, while Kalyan Ram's son Nandamuri Sourya Ram also makes his debut as a child artist. The music was composed by Anup Rubens. Junaid Siddiqui, Mukesh G and Johnny Shaik handled the editing, cinematography and Art direction respectively. It was shot in August 2016 in Valencia, Spain.

The film follows Kalyan Ram, a Tenerife-based fighter who tries to woo Alia, the daughter of a gangster named Javed Ibrahim. Kalyan and Javed become friends without revealing their identities to each other, but after a series of events, it is revealed that Kalyan is an undercover journalist who exposes the corrupt with the help of his team of hackers. He soon becomes the target of Javed and corrupt politicians as he returns to India and resumes his mission.

The film was released theatrically on 21 October 2016.

Plot
Javed Ibrahim, is a high-profile gangster who is in hiding in Tenerife islands with his gang and daughter, Alia, due to several of his scams being exposed in India. Kalyan Ram, happens to see her during a fight at an illegal fight club and falls head over heels for her. He even befriends Javed Bhai after offering him local Indian Karim Beedis. However, neither of them disclose their identities to each other. With the help of marriage broker Don Bosco, Javed Bhai gets Alia engaged to the Prince of Persia. Meanwhile, Javed Bhai helps Kalyan woo a girl he likes, unaware that the girl is his daughter. Alia slowly falls for Kalyan Ram, and informs Javed Bhai, who, realizing her lover is Kalyan, attempts to prove to her that he is cheating her. However, on seeing them, Kalyan runs away from there, eventually jumping into sea.

Meanwhile, in India, The Grand Leakage Company, a website/company, reveals Javed Bhai's whereabouts, and by seeing through the plan, Javed Bhai and Alia realise that the founder of the company, who has been unknown for years, is none other than Kalyan Ram. Alia, who is still madly in love with him, runs away from their yacht and escapes to India. Meanwhile, Kalyan, whose actual name is Sathya Marthand, is an undercover journalist whose father, Dasaradh Rao was handicapped by a criminal contractor when the former, a journalist, exposed the latter's use of faulty cement to construct buildings. Sathya, in retaliation, attempted to kill the contractor, but realised that the idea of a crime is what encourages corruption. He, hence, is on a journey to fight corruption. He gets information about Bank of Paradise, a Tenerife-based bank owned by Javed Bhai, which holds over a billiard rupees. The Grand Leakage Company has employed over thousands of anonymous journalism students, who together, take on corruption in India. Alia lands in India and tracks down Sathya's address, threatening to kill his parents and herself if he does not return home. Sathya returns, but tells her that he does not have any feelings for her. However, his parents, who have grown fond of Alia, refuse to let her go, and try forcing Sathya to wed her. After gathering details about Sathya, Javed Bhai informs the police about his activities, including his plan to wipe off the entire money present at Bank of Paradise.

They are almost successful, but the police catch Sathya, and his 4 friends, who were assigned the task of completing the operation, are brutally murdered by local goons. After giving a stellar session in court, the public realise Sathya's goodness, including his craving for justice to all families below the poverty line. He even lets out the code of the accounts in the bank, letting his co "hacktivists" hack into the Bank of Paradise, dividing the money equally into the bank account of every above-poverty line Indian citizen, requesting them to give at least 10% of their money to below poverty line farmers and families, else they will be the reason their country gets ruined. He is then taken to be escorted to the Central Jail. En Route, they are stopped and Sathya is kidnapped by Javed Bhai's men. Javed Bhai tells a reluctant Sathya to marry Alia, but is double-crossed by his henchmen who are ordered to kill Sathya by Minister Kotilinga, who was also involved in Javed's scams. Javed and Sathya take down all the goons. The film ends with Javed returning to Tenerife to continue his business, after having dropped Alia and Sathya in Goa, who then go undercover again.

Cast
Nandamuri Kalyan Ram as Sathya Marthand / Kalyan Ram
Aditi Arya as Alia Khan 
Jagapati Babu as Javed Ibrahim / Javed Bhai
Vennela Kishore as Sathya's friend
Posani Krishna Murali as Minister Kotilingalu
Ali as Don Bosco
Jaya Prakash Reddy as MLA JP
Tanikella Bharani as Dasaradharamaiah
Easwari Rao as Satyavathi / Ammaji
Srikanth Iyyengar as Police Officer Trivedi
Shatru as Javed Bhai's henchmen 
Ajay Ghosh as Reporter 
Raghu Karumanchi
Ravi Awana

Soundtrack

Music composed by Anup Rubens. Music released on ADITYA Music Company. Audio was launched on 5 October 2016, held at Hyderabad. Nandamuri Harikrishna NTR, Dil Raju and many other celebrities attended the function. 

Hindi Dubbed Soundtrack launched on 14 September 2019 on Digital Music Platforms.

Reception 
The Times of India gave 2.5/5 by making a remark about the movie that "As grand as the story sounds, the movie is quite predictably every Puri film ever -- an unconquerable hero, a larger than life conspiracy, a bimbo who falls in love as a result of stalking."

References

External links
 
 
 

2016 films
2010s Telugu-language films
2016 action films
Indian action films
Indian vigilante films
Journalism adapted into films
Films directed by Puri Jagannadh
Films scored by Anoop Rubens
Films about journalism
Films about journalists
Films about whistleblowing
Films about social issues in India
Films about corruption in India
Films set in the 2010s
Films set in the Canary Islands
Films set in India
Works about computer hacking
Films shot in Spain